Edward Werge (9 September 1936 – 2007) was an English professional footballer who played as a winger or wing half. He made a total of 160 appearances in the Football League for Charlton Athletic, Crystal Palace and Leyton Orient. He also had a spell in mid-career in South Africa playing for Arcadia Shepherds.

Playing career

Early career
Eddie Werge began his youth career at Bexleyheath and Welling (later known as Bexley United) before signing for local professional club, Charlton Athletic in 1957. He made 44 appearances for Charlton between then and 1961, scoring 19 goals.

Crystal Palace, South Africa and Leyton Orient
In May 1961, Werge signed for Crystal Palace for whom he made 83 appearances, scoring 6 times. Werge spent the 1965–66 season in South African football playing for Arcadia Shepherds before returning to England in December 1966 when he signed for Leyton Orient, where he finished his professional career.

Later career
In 1968, having made a further 33 appearances for Orient, (no goals) he moved back into non-league football with Bexleyheath, by this time known as Bexley United.

After his football career ended, Werge became a driving instructor.

Eddie Werge died in 2007 aged 70 or 71.

References

External links

1936 births
2007 deaths
Footballers from Sidcup
English footballers
English Football League players
Association football midfielders
Bexley United F.C. players
Charlton Athletic F.C. players
Crystal Palace F.C. players
Arcadia Shepherds F.C. players
Leyton Orient F.C. players